Kevin Paul (born 30 June 1991) is a South African Paralympic swimmer. Competing in the SB9-class 100 m breaststroke he won gold medals at the 2008 and 2016 Paralympics and a silver medal at the 2012 London Game.

References

Living people
World record holders in paralympic swimming
1991 births
Sportspeople from Port Elizabeth
Nelson Mandela University alumni
Swimmers at the 2008 Summer Paralympics
Swimmers at the 2012 Summer Paralympics
Swimmers at the 2016 Summer Paralympics
Medalists at the 2008 Summer Paralympics
Medalists at the 2012 Summer Paralympics
Paralympic gold medalists for South Africa
Paralympic silver medalists for South Africa
S10-classified Paralympic swimmers
African Games gold medalists for South Africa
African Games medalists in swimming
Competitors at the 2011 All-Africa Games
Medalists at the World Para Swimming Championships
Paralympic medalists in swimming
Paralympic swimmers of South Africa
Male breaststroke swimmers
20th-century South African people
21st-century South African people